NGC 60 is an Sc type spiral galaxy in the Pisces constellation.
NGC 60 is noticed for its unusually distorted spiral arms, which are commonly due to gravitational effects of neighboring galaxies, but there are no galaxies around NGC 60 to allow this.

References

External links
 
 
 SEDS: NGC 60
 RCSED: NGC 60

NGC 0060
NGC 0060
0060
0150
01058
18821102